Cornelisse is a Dutch patronymic surname meaning "son of Cornelis". It may refer to:

Henk Cornelisse (b. 1940), Dutch track racing cyclist
Jan Cornelisse, mistaken identification of "Ko Cornelissen" (1904-1992), Dutch boxer 
Michel Cornelisse (b. 1965), Dutch road racing cyclist and directeur sportif
Tim Cornelisse (b. 1978),  Dutch footballer, brother of Yuri
Tonya Cornelisse (b. 1980s), American actress
Yuri Cornelisse (b. 1975), Dutch footballer, brother of Tim

See also
Cornelissen

Dutch-language surnames
Patronymic surnames
Surnames from given names